The life saving competition at the 2017 World Games took place from July 21 to July 22, in Wrocław in Poland, at the Orbita Swimming Pool.

Participating nations

Medal table

Medalists

Men

Women

External links
 The World Games 2017
 Result Book

 
2017 World Games
2017